Windmill Software is a Canadian software company. Windmill Software today publishes property management software and management information system software, but the company is more notable for its past role as a developer, marketer, publisher, and distributor of computer and video games. The company developed several games for the IBM PC in the early 1980s.  Windmill Software was acquired by Dude Solutions in March 2015.

Games
Floppy Frenzy (1982)
Video Trek 88 (1982)
Attack on Altair (1983)
Conquest (1983)
Digger (1983)
The Exterminator (1983)
Moonbugs (1983) -- a rare example of a 16-color RGBI CGA title 
Rollo And The Brush Bros (1983)
Styx (1983)

Unreleased
Vortex (a Tempest clone)
PeeWee (a Q*bert clone)
A version of Asteroids

References

External links
"About Windmill Software", digger.org. Retrieved 25 January 2011.
Windmill Software website

Video game companies of Canada
Video game development companies